Louisa James (born 5 July 1994) is a British hammer thrower, who won an individual gold medal at the Youth World Championships.

References

External links

1994 births
Living people
British female hammer throwers
Athletes (track and field) at the 2010 Summer Youth Olympics